The men's light heavyweight event was part of the weightlifting programme at the 1928 Summer Olympics. The weight class was the second-heaviest contested, and allowed weightlifters of up to 82.5 kilograms (181.5 pounds). The competition was held on Sunday, 29 July 1928.

Records
These were the standing world and Olympic records (in kilograms) prior to the 1928 Summer Olympics.

(*) Originally a five lift competition.

All four Olympic records were improved in this competition. El Sayed Nosseir set a new world record in snatch with 112.5 kilograms and in the total of the three lifts with 355 kilograms.

Results

References

Sources
 Olympic Report 
 

Light heavyweight